Duchess Luise of Brunswick-Wolfenbüttel (Luise Amalie; 29 January 1722 – 13 January 1780) was daughter of Ferdinand Albert II, Duke of Brunswick-Wolfenbüttel and his wife Duchess Antoinette of Brunswick-Wolfenbüttel.

Background

She was born at the Schloss Bevern near Weser. She was the seventh of fourteen children. Her parents were second cousins.

Marriage

On 6 January 1742 she married Prince Augustus William of Prussia, second son of King Frederick William I of Prussia and Sophia Dorothea of Hanover. Prince Augustus William was a younger brother of the reigning Frederick the Great, whose spouse, Luise's own sister, gave him no children. As such, her son was to inherit the Prussian throne in 1786. In her widowhood, she was given the Crown Prince's Palace in Berlin.

Family

Her older sister was Queen Elisabeth Christine of Prussia, wife of her brother-in-law Frederick the Great. She was also the sibling of Queen Juliana Maria of Denmark and Norway and Charles I, Duke of Brunswick-Wolfenbüttel.

Issue

Frederick William II of Prussia (1744–1797) married Elisabeth Christine of Brunswick-Wolfenbüttel and had issue. Married Frederica Louisa of Hesse-Darmstadt and had issue.
Prince Henry of Prussia (1747–1767) died unmarried.
Princess Wilhelmina of Prussia (1751–1820) married William V, Prince of Orange and had issue.
Prince Emil of Prussia (1758–1759) died in infancy.

Ancestry

References 

1722 births
1780 deaths
House of Brunswick-Bevern
Prussian princesses
House of Hohenzollern
18th-century German people
Burials at Berlin Cathedral
Daughters of monarchs